Automne Pavia (born 3 January 1989) is a French judoka. In 2012, she won bronze at the 2012 Summer Olympics in the class –57 kg.

At the 2012 Summer Olympics, she beat Sarah Clark, Carli Renzi and Sabrina Filzmoser before losing to Kaori Matsumoto in the semi-final.   She then beat Hedvig Karakas in her bronze medal match.

At the 2016 Olympics, she beat Nekoda Smythe-Davis, before losing to Matsumoto again.  In the repechage, she lost to Telma Monteiro.

Personal life 
She married judoka Ashley McKenzie.

References

External links

 
 
 
 
 

1989 births
Living people
People from Péronne, Somme
French female judoka
Judoka at the 2012 Summer Olympics
Judoka at the 2016 Summer Olympics
Olympic medalists in judo
Olympic bronze medalists for France
Olympic judoka of France
Medalists at the 2012 Summer Olympics
Knights of the Ordre national du Mérite
European Games gold medalists for France
European Games medalists in judo
Judoka at the 2015 European Games
Sportspeople from Somme (department)
21st-century French women